This is a list of councillors and aldermen elected to the London County Council from 1919 to 1937.

Councillors 1919–1928

In 1919 triennial elections to the London County Council resumed. The elections due in 1916 had been postponed due to the First World War, and vacancies had been filled by co-option.

The size of the council was increased to 124 councillors and 20 aldermen from 1919. The councillors were elected for electoral divisions corresponding to the new parliamentary constituencies that had been created by the Representation of the People Act 1918. Seven women were elected in 1919.

¶ Previously an alderman.

County aldermen 1919–1934

In addition to the 124 councillors the council consisted of 20 county aldermen. Aldermen were elected by the council, and served a six-year term. Half of the aldermanic bench (nine or ten aldermen) were elected every three years following the triennial council election.

Party strength 1919–1928

The strength of the parties on the council after each election was as follows:

Councillors 1928–1937

‡ Previously councillor for a different division.
¶ Previously an alderman.

County aldermen 1928–1937

Party strength 1928–1937

The strength of the parties on the council after each election was as follows:

See also
List of members of London County Council 1889–1919
List of members of London County Council 1937–1949
List of chairmen of the London County Council
1919 London County Council election
1922 London County Council election

References 

 
London County Council